Carl Robert Ditterich (born 10 October 1945) is a former Australian rules footballer who played for the St Kilda Football Club and Melbourne Football Club in the Victorian Football League (VFL).  He also coached Melbourne for two years, as a playing coach.

Ditterich, known as the "Blonde Bombshell", made an impressive debut as a 17-year-old for St Kilda against Melbourne in the opening round of the 1963 VFL season, with his speed, high leaping and endurance noted.

He became a tough ruckman and often appeared at the VFL Tribunal, in particular missing St Kilda's only premiership victory in 1966 through suspension.

In 1973, he transferred to Melbourne under the VFL's short-lived "10-year rule, which allowed players with ten years' service at one club to move to another club without a clearance, before returning to St Kilda in 1976, due to his six-year deal being too expensive for Melbourne to continue.

After Football
Ditterich purchased a wheat farm near Swan Hill, Victoria. He coached nearby Woorinen (Mid Murray FL) for two seasons 1983 and 1984. Eighteen years later he coached Boort in the North Central Football League in 2002 and 2003. 

Ditterich unsuccessfully stood as an independent candidate for the seat of Swan Hill in the 1999 Victorian state election.

Statistics

|- style="background-color: #EAEAEA"
! scope="row" style="text-align:center" | 1963
|
| 10 || 17 || 3 ||  ||  ||  ||  ||  ||  ||  || 0.2 ||  ||  ||  ||  ||  ||  || 
|-
! scope="row" style="text-align:center" | 1964
|
| 10 || 17 || 5 ||  ||  ||  ||  ||  ||  ||  || 0.3 ||  ||  ||  ||  ||  ||  || 
|- style="background-color: #EAEAEA"
! scope="row" style="text-align:center" | 1965
|
| 10 || 13 || 8 || 13 || 199 || 28 || 227 || 70 ||  ||  || 0.6 || 1.0 || 15.3 || 2.2 || 17.5 || 5.4 ||  || 
|-
! scope="row" style="text-align:center" | 1966
|
| 10 || 12 || 9 || 13 || 167 || 36 || 203 || 41 ||  || 116 || 0.8 || 1.1 || 13.9 || 3.0 || 16.9 || 3.4 ||  || 10.5
|- style="background-color: #EAEAEA"
! scope="row" style="text-align:center" | 1967
|
| 10 || 12 || 18 || 18 || 169 || 19 || 188 || 49 ||  || 185 || 1.5 || 1.5 || 14.1 || 1.6 || 15.7 || 4.1 ||  || 15.4
|-
! scope="row" style="text-align:center" | 1968
|
| 10 || 20 || 5 || 9 || 317 || 71 || 388 || 123 ||  || 335 || 0.3 || 0.5 || 15.9 || 3.6 || 19.4 || 6.2 ||  || 16.8
|- style="background-color: #EAEAEA"
! scope="row" style="text-align:center" | 1969
|
| 10 || 8 || 16 || 8 || 90 || 20 || 110 || 39 ||  || 59 || 2.0 || 1.0 || 11.3 || 2.5 || 13.8 || 4.9 ||  || 7.4
|-
! scope="row" style="text-align:center" | 1970
|
| 10 || 16 || 14 || 13 || 202 || 56 || 258 || 94 ||  || 96 || 0.9 || 0.8 || 12.6 || 3.5 || 16.1 || 5.9 ||  || 6.0
|- style="background-color: #EAEAEA"
! scope="row" style="text-align:center" | 1971
|
| 10 || 16 || 23 || 12 || 233 || 50 || 283 || 91 ||  || 137 || 1.4 || 0.8 || 14.6 || 3.1 || 17.7 || 5.7 ||  || 8.6
|-
! scope="row" style="text-align:center" | 1972
|
| 10 || 22 || 22 || 14 || 317 || 101 || 418 || 127 ||  || 241 || 1.0 || 0.6 || 14.4 || 4.6 || 19.0 || 5.8 ||  || 12.0
|- style="background-color: #EAEAEA"
! scope="row" style="text-align:center" | 1973
|
| 10 || 22 || 5 || 13 || 256 || 44 || 300 || 96 ||  || 298 || 0.2 || 0.6 || 11.6 || 2.0 || 13.6 || 4.4 ||  || 13.5
|-
! scope="row" style="text-align:center" | 1974
|
| 10 || 19 || 12 || 9 || 214 || 78 || 292 || 79 ||  || 8 || 0.6 || 0.5 || 11.3 || 4.1 || 15.4 || 4.2 ||  || 8.0
|- style="background-color: #EAEAEA"
! scope="row" style="text-align:center" | 1975
|
| 10 || 12 || 18 || 6 || 114 || 57 || 171 || 34 ||  || 18 || 1.5 || 0.6 || 10.4 || 5.2 || 15.5 || 3.1 ||  || 3.6
|-
! scope="row" style="text-align:center" | 1976
|
| 10 || 18 || 11 || 3 || 154 || 72 || 226 || 51 ||  || 203 || 0.6 || 0.2 || 8.6 || 4.0 || 12.6 || 2.8 ||  || 11.3
|- style="background-color: #EAEAEA"
! scope="row" style="text-align:center" | 1977
|
| 10 || 11 || 6 || 4 || 83 || 39 || 122 || 27 ||  || 99 || 0.5 || 0.4 || 7.5 || 3.5 || 11.1 || 2.5 ||  || 9.0
|-
! scope="row" style="text-align:center" | 1978
|
| 10 || 21 || 16 || 13 || 172 || 80 || 252 || 60 ||  || 197 || 0.8 || 0.7 || 8.2 || 3.8 || 12.0 || 2.9 ||  || 10.4
|- style="background-color: #EAEAEA"
! scope="row" style="text-align:center" | 1979
|
| 10 || 17 || 6 || 4 || 178 || 103 || 281 || 70 ||  || 175 || 0.4 || 0.2 || 10.5 || 6.1 || 16.5 || 4.1 ||  || 10.3
|-
! scope="row" style="text-align:center" | 1980
|
| 10 || 12 || 2 || 6 || 76 || 76 || 152 || 28 ||  || 122 || 0.2 || 0.5 || 6.3 || 6.3 || 12.7 || 2.3 ||  || 10.2
|- class="sortbottom"
! colspan=3| Career
! 285
! 199
! 158
! 2941
! 930
! 3871
! 1079
! 
! 2289
! 0.7
! 0.6
! 11.8
! 3.7
! 15.5
! 4.3
! 
! 11.0
|}

References

External links

Carl Ditterich's coaching statistics from AFL Tables

Demon Wiki profile
 Carl Ditterich: Boyles Football Photos.

1945 births
Living people
Trevor Barker Award winners
St Kilda Football Club players
Melbourne Football Club players
Melbourne Football Club coaches
Australian Football Hall of Fame inductees
Keith 'Bluey' Truscott Trophy winners
Australian people of German descent
Melbourne Football Club captains
Australian rules footballers from Victoria (Australia)